The 2019–20 Alabama Crimson Tide men's basketball team represented the University of Alabama in the 2019–20 NCAA Division I men's basketball season. The team was led by first-year head coach Nate Oats, The Crimson Tide played their home games at Coleman Coliseum in Tuscaloosa, Alabama as a member of the Southeastern Conference. They finished the season 16–15, 8–10 in SEC play to finish in ninth place. They were set to take on Tennessee in the second round of the SEC tournament. However, they remainder of the SEC Tournament was cancelled amid the COVID-19 pandemic.

Previous season
The Crimson Tide finished the 2018–19 season 18–16, 8–10 to finish in eighth place in SEC play. They defeated Ole Miss to advance to the quarterfinals of the SEC tournament where they lost to Kentucky. They received a bid to the National Invitational Tournament where they lost in the first round to Norfolk State.

Offseason   
It was announced on March 24, 2019, that the University of Alabama and Head Coach Avery Johnson had mutually agreed to part ways after four seasons. Johnson's contract was supposed to run through the 2023 season and would have paid him $2.9 Million. On March 27, 2019, the school hired Buffalo head coach Nate Oats as the school's new coach.

Guard Dazon Ingram announced that he would be transfer.

Departures

Incoming Transfers

Recruits

2019–20 team recruits

Preseason

SEC media poll
The SEC media poll was released on October 15, 2019.

Preseason All-SEC teams
The Crimson Tide had one player selected to the preseason all-SEC teams.

Second Team

Kira Lewis Jr.

Roster

Schedule and results

|-
!colspan=12 style=|Exhibition

|-
!colspan=12 style=|Regular season

|-
!colspan=12 style=|  SEC Tournament

References    

Alabama
Alabama Crimson Tide men's basketball seasons
Alabama Crimson Tide
Alabama Crimson Tide